German submarine U-32 was a Type VIIA U-boat of Nazi Germany's Kriegsmarine during World War II.

Her keel was laid down on 15 March 1936 by DeSchiMAG AG Weser of Bremen as yard number 913. She was launched on 25 February 1937 and commissioned on 15 April with Kapitänleutnant Werner Lott in command. On 15 August 1937, Lott was relieved by Korvettenkapitän Paul Büchel, and on 12 February 1940, Oberleutnant zur See Hans Jenisch took over. He was in charge of the boat until her loss.

Design
As one of the first ten German Type VII submarines later designated as Type VIIA submarines, U-32 had a displacement of  when at the surface and  while submerged. She had two shafts and two  propellers.

U-32 was fitted with five  torpedo tubes (four fitted at the bow and one at the stern), eleven torpedoes, one  SK C/35 naval gun, 220 rounds, and an anti-aircraft gun. The boat had a complement of between forty-four and sixty.

Service history
On 28 October 1940 U-32, under the command of Hans Jenisch, sank the 42,348 GRT liner , which had been previously damaged by German bombs. Empress was the largest ship sunk by a U-boat.

Fate
Nine crew members were killed; 33 survived and became prisoners of war, including Jenisch. Jenisch then spent six and a half years in British captivity before returning to Germany in June 1947.

Wolfpacks
U-32 took part in one wolfpack, namely:
 Prien (12 – 17 June 1940)

Summary of raiding history

References

Notes

Citations

Bibliography

External links

German Type VIIA submarines
U-boats commissioned in 1937
U-boats sunk in 1940
World War II submarines of Germany
U-boats sunk by British warships
U-boats sunk by depth charges
1937 ships
World War II shipwrecks in the Atlantic Ocean
Ships built in Bremen (state)
Military units and formations of Nazi Germany in the Spanish Civil War
Maritime incidents in October 1940